Euthalia alpheda is an Indomalayan butterfly of the family Nymphalidae (Limenitidinae).

Subspecies
E. a. alpheda (Java)
E. a. parta (Moore, [1858]) (northern Borneo)
E. a. jama (C. & R. Felder, [1867]) (Nepal, Sikkim, Assam)
E. a. numerica Weymer, 1885 (Nias)
E. a. phelada Semper, 1888 (Philippines: Luzon)
E. a. bangkana Fruhstorfer, 1906 (Bangka)
E. a. krannon Fruhstorfer, 1906 (Borneo)
E. a. yamuna Fruhstorfer, 1906 (Peninsular Malaya, Peninsular Thailand)
E. a. kenodotus Fruhstorfer, 1906 (Sumatra)
E. a. verena Fruhstorfer, 1913 (Burma, Thailand)
E. a. cusama Fruhstorfer, 1913 (Philippines: Mindanao)
E. a. soregina Fruhstorfer, 1913 (Sulu Islands)
E. a. dammermani van Eecke, 1932
E. a. langkawica Eliot, 1980 (Langkawi)
E. a. liaoi Schröder & Treadaway, 1982 (Philippines: Panay)
E. a. sibuyana Schröder & Treadaway, 1982 (Philippines: Sibuyan, Romblon Group)
E . a. rodriguezi Schröder & Treadaway, 1982 (Philippines: Palawan)
E. a. mindorensis Schröder & Treadaway, 1982 (Philippines: Mindoro)
E. a. leytana Schröder & Treadaway, 1982 (Philippines: Leyte)

References

Butterflies described in 1824
alpheda